Richman Brothers was a retail men's clothing chain in the United States. It was a subsidiary of the F. W. Woolworth Company. 

Richman was founded in Ohio in 1853. It came to be known as a men’s fine clothing store. Though initially the stores would sell only men’s suits, coats, and hats, during the last years of its existence it also sold women’s clothing. There were several stores across the United States, including Nebraska and Indiana. 

The company allowed its workers to purchase stock below market price, and provided funds for supporting the staff during downturns.  As a result of their worker-friendly policies they had little labor trouble during the Depression. 

Richman closed in the early 1990s.

References

External links
 The Richman Brothers Company Records (1924-1992) at the Western Reserve Historical Society 

Richman Brothers Co.
1853 establishments in Ohio
Defunct retail companies of the United States
History of Cleveland
Retail companies established in 1853
Retail companies disestablished in 1992
Clothing brands of the United States
Defunct companies based in Cleveland